Duane Ackerson (October 17, 1942 – April 19, 2020) was an American writer of speculative poetry and fiction.

Не taught at the University of Oregon, then headed the creative program at Idaho State University. He lived in Salem, Oregon, where he died on April 19, 2020.

Duane Ackerson's work has appeared in anthologies that include The Year's Best SF 1974, 100 Great Science Fiction Short Short Stories, Future Pastimes, and the textbook Writing Poetry. He has won the Rhysling Award for Best Short Poem twice, in 1978 and 1979.

Ackerson's poems are translated into Russian by Dmitry Kuzmin.

Bibliography 
 The Bird at the End of the Universe
 The Eggplant & Other Absurdities
 Weathering
 UA Flight to Chicago. Lincoln, Nebraska: The Best Cellar Press, 1971.

References

External links
 

1942 births
2020 deaths
20th-century American male writers
20th-century American poets
American male novelists
American male poets
American male short story writers
American science fiction writers
American short story writers
Idaho State University faculty
Novelists from New York (state)
Novelists from Oregon
Rhysling Award for Best Short Poem winners
Writers from New York City
Writers from Salem, Oregon
University of Oregon faculty